The Carstone Formation is a geological formation in England. It preserves fossils dating back to the Albian stage of the Cretaceous period. It predominantly consists of "greenish-brown (rusty when weathered), thick-bedded, cross-bedded, oolitic ferruginous sandstone".

See also

 Carrstone
 List of fossiliferous stratigraphic units in England

References

 

Cretaceous England
Albian Stage
Lower Cretaceous Series of Europe